
Gmina Kuźnica is a rural gmina (administrative district) in Sokółka County, Podlaskie Voivodeship, in north-eastern Poland, on the border with Belarus.

Villages
Gmina Kuźnica contains the villages and settlements of Achrymowce, Auls, Białobłockie, Bilminy, Chreptowce, Cimanie, Czepiele, Czuprynowo, Długosielce, Dubnica Kurpiowska, Gładowszczyzna, Kierkielewszczyzna, Klimówka, Kowale, Kowale-Kolonia, Kruglany, Kryski, Kuścin, Kuścińce, Kuźnica, Litwinki, Łosośna Mała, Łosośna Wielka, Łowczyki, Mieleszkowce Pawłowickie, Mieleszkowce Zalesiańskie, Milenkowce, Nowodziel, Palestyna, Parczowce, Popławce, Saczkowce, Starowlany, Sterpejki, Szalciny, Szymaki, Tołcze, Tołoczki Małe, Tołoczki Wielkie, Ułeczki, Wojnowce, Wołkusze, Wołyńce, Wyzgi and Zajzdra.

Neighbouring gminas
Gmina Kuźnica is bordered by the gminas of Nowy Dwór, Sidra and Sokółka. It also borders Belarus.

References
Polish official population figures 2006

Kuznica
Sokółka County